The discography of Banda Calypso comprises twenty albums in a fifteen-year career, divided into twelve studio albums, eight live albums and four promotional albums with five collections. Even without the presence of a major label the band has remained among the biggest sellers in the country, selling more than 16 million CDs and more than 5 million DVDs. In all, the band's CDs have received 14 gold, 10 diamonds, 13 platinum and 13 double platinum. In addition, the band has had two Latin Grammy nominations. They have sold more CDs in the 2000s than any other Brazilian band and are currently the largest sellers of DVDs in Brazil.

Among the highlights of the band's discography are albums Banda Calypso, Volume 8 which sold over 1.8 Million copies, becoming the best-selling album in Brazilian music history, the album Banda Calypso, Live in Brazil which won the Diamond Quintuple certificate, the only band to have won this award, and the album Banda Calypso, Live in Angola. The latter contains the track The Sound of Africa , a duet in honor of Angola with the participation of Angolan singer Anselmo Ralph. The DVD Calypso by Brazil was 24 weeks on the bestseller list of Brazil.

Albums

Collections

Promotional albums

Tours 

 1999: Tour Live
 2003: Tour Live in São Paulo
 2004: Tour in Amazônia
 2006: Tour at Brazil
 2007: Tour Accelerated!
 2009: Tour 10 Years
 2010: Tour Vem Balançar!
 2011: Tour Angola
 2014: Tour A Festa Começou 
 2015: Tour 15 Years

Appearances 

In addition to these holdings, Banda Calypso also invited several artists to do duets, like: Another Chance (Leonardo), gum with Calypso (Gum with Banana), Sweet Honey (Edu & Maraial), Sunday to Sunday (Maraial), No Direction (Fagner), a New Being (Voice of Truth), nor Yes, No no (Bruno e Marrone), I can not deny that Te Amo (Reginaldo Rossi), who loves does not stop loving (Amado Batista).

Soundtracks

Videoclips

References

Discographies of Brazilian artists
Latin music discographies